Science education  in England is generally regulated at all levels for assessments that are England's, from 'primary' to 'tertiary' (university). Below university level, science education is the responsibility of three bodies: the Department for Education, Ofqual and the QAA, but at university level, science education is regulated by various professional bodies, and the Bologna Process via the QAA. The QAA also regulates science education for some qualifications that are not university degrees via various qualification boards, but not content for GCSEs, and GCE AS and A levels. Ofqual on the other hand regulates science education for GCSEs and AS/A levels, as well as all other qualifications, except those covered by the QAA, also via qualification boards.

The Department for Education prescribes the content for science education for GCSEs and AS/A levels, which is implemented by the qualification boards, who are then regulated by Ofqual. The Department for Education also regulates science education for students aged 16 years and under. The department's policies on science education (and indeed all subjects) are implemented by local government authorities on all state schools (also called publicly funded schools) in England. The content of the nationally organised science curriculum (along with other subjects) for England is published in the National Curriculum, which covers key stage 1 (KS1), key stage 2 (KS2), key stage 3 (KS3) and key stage 4 (KS4). The four key stages can be grouped a number of ways; how they are grouped significantly affects the way the science curriculum is delivered. In state schools, the four key stages are grouped into KS1–2 and KS3–4; KS1–2 covers primary education while KS3–4 covers secondary education. But in private or public (which in the United Kingdom are historic independent) schools (not to be confused with 'publicly funded' schools), the key stage grouping is more variable, and rather than using the terms ‘primary’ and 'secondary’, the terms ‘prep’ and ‘senior’ are used instead.

Science is a compulsory subject in the National Curriculum of England, Wales and Northern Ireland; state schools have to follow the National Curriculum while independent schools need not follow it. That said, science is compulsory in the Common Entrance Examination for entry into senior schools, so it does feature prominently in the curricula of independent schools. Beyond the National Curriculum and Common Entrance Examination, science is voluntary, but the government of the United Kingdom (comprising England, Wales, Scotland and Northern Ireland) provides incentives for students to continue studying science subjects. Science is regarded as vital to the economic growth of the United Kingdom (UK). For students aged 16 years (the upper limit of compulsory school age in England, but not compulsory education as a whole) and over, there is no compulsory nationally organised science curriculum for all state/publicly funded education providers in England to follow, and individual providers can set their own content, although they often (and in the case of England's state/publicly funded post-16 schools and colleges have to) get their science (and indeed all) courses accredited or made satisfactory (ultimately by either Ofqual or the QAA via the qualification boards). Universities do not need such approval, but there is a reason for them to seek accreditation regardless. Moreover, UK universities have obligations to the Bologna Process to ensure high standards. Science education in England has undergone significant changes over the centuries; facing challenges over that period, and still facing challenges to this day.

History

Up to 1800
Gillard (2011) gives a documented account of science curriculum and education during this period. According to his work, the teaching of science in England dates back to at least Anglo-Saxon times. Gillard explains that the first schools in England (that are known of) were created by St Augustine when he brought Christianity to England around the end of the sixth century—there were almost certainly schools in Roman Britain before St Augustine, but they did not survive after the Romans left. It is thought the first grammar school was established at Canterbury in 598 during the reign of King Ethelbert. Gillard also mentions Bede's Ecclesiastical History, here science (in the form of astronomy) was already part of the curriculum in the early schools of the 600s. As the founding of grammar schools spread from south to north of England, science education spread with it. Science as it is known today developed from two spheres of knowledge: natural philosophy and natural history. The former was associated with the reasoning and explanation of nature while the latter focused more on living things. Both strands of knowledge can be identified in a curriculum provided by a school in York run by Alcuin in the 770s and 780s. Subsequent Viking invasions of England interrupted the development of schools, but despite this, through the ages, education in England was provided by the church and grammar schools (which were linked to the church). The link between church and school started to change in the 1300s when schools independent of the church began to emerge. University education in England started in Oxford in the 1100s (although there is evidence that teaching began there in the 1000s). Like pre-university education, science at Oxford University was initially taught in the form of astronomy (as part of the quadrivium). The Renaissance spurred physical inquiry into nature which led to natural philosophy developing into physics and chemistry, and natural history developing into biology; these three disciplines form natural science, from which interdisciplinary fields (or at least their modern versions) that overlap two or all three branches of natural science develop. This emerging trend in physical inquiry do not appear to have been reflected in the science curriculum in schools at the time. Even in universities, the changes to science education that were necessary as a result of the Renaissance occurred very slowly. It was not till the 1800s that the science curriculum and education recognised in England today at all levels truly began to emerge.

1800s
Up until the 1800s there were only two stages of education: elementary and university. However, in the nineteenth century, elementary education began to divide into primary (still called elementary) and secondary education. Elementary schools were defined in law in England through a series of Acts of Parliament which made education compulsory and free for children up to the age of 11 (later increased to 12). There were six (and later seven) standards for children to pass; science education did not feature in any of these standards, but for some schools it was an add-on especially at the higher standards (such as sixth and seventh—science subjects included physics, chemistry, mechanics). Promotion from one standard to the next was on merit and not age. Not all children completed all standards, which meant that by the age of 12, there were children that had not ‘completed’ their elementary education. Of course families that could afford (and wanted) to keep their children in school post-compulsory age to pass all standards did so. In fact some children stayed in school beyond the seventh standard. Schools that offered post-seventh standard education became known as higher grade schools, of which science education was a recognised feature of their curricula.

Taunton Report 1868
This was by far the single most important development for science education in schools in England in the nineteenth century from a British parliament point of view. Ironically the original purpose of the committee that authored the 'Taunton' Report of 1868, or more formally, Volume II Miscellaneous Papers of the Schools Inquiry Commission (1868), was to examine how best endowed schools should be managed; something Parliament at the time thought was of utmost importance. The committee for the report was chaired by Lord Taunton (born Henry Labouchere). In heading the preparation for the report, Lord Taunton sent a circular letter listing four questions to a number of prominent people in different parts of England on 28 May 1866; the first three were endowment-related issues, but the fourth question was on how to encourage a due supply of qualified teachers. Apart from the contents page, the word "science" first appears on page 45 of the report in a reply by one of the recipients of the circular letter; that recipient was Reverend W C Lake. The reverend comments:
The question as to the best mode to be adopted for obtaining teachers both in sufficient numbers, and of the kind desirable for middle-class, education, seems to me more difficult than it would at first appear. ... you want men with an University culture, and yet not with exactly an University education ... You do not, I presume, want them to teach Greek; and as to Latin it ought not, in my opinion at least, to be the staple work of the school compared with arithmetic, some mathematics, modern languages, and history, and the principles of some important branches of physical science.
(Rev. Lake's reply to Lord Taunton IN Report by Schools Inquiry Commission, 1868: p45)
On page 77 of the report, Edward Twisleton, a member of the Schools Inquiry Commission, comments on the answers provided to the four questions set by the committee's chairman, Lord Taunton, based on feedback from the circular letter sent. To the first question, Twisleton writes:
In providing,—what is generally a part of the arrangements of Prussian gymnasia—a museum of natural history and a cabinet with the philosophical instruments and other materials requisite for instruction in the experimental sciences. The Prussian system should be followed, in which two hours of each week are devoted throughout the school to lessons in these branches of knowledge; the instruction in the lower classes being in sciences of pure observation, such, as zoology and botany, while in the upper parts of the school instruction is given in the sciences usually called experimental, such as pneumatics, hydrostatics, and others. This system, however, cannot be adopted, unless there is a certain preliminary outlay of money, and it seems unobjectionable that this money should come from an endowment.
(Twisleton's response IN Report by Schools Inquiry Commission, 1868: p77)
There were noticeable opinions on the issue of science education from contributors that wrote to the committee to express their views. One by Robert Mosley of Holgate Seminary, York (pages 104 to 105 of the report), suggested the inclusion of physical sciences in a 'National education'; this national education being the best way to utilise educational endowment. Based on feedback from contributors, the Taunton Committee gave several arguments in favour of science education; two of them are:
As providing the best discipline in observation and collection of facts, in the combination of inductive with deductive reasoning, and in accuracy both of thought and language. 
and
Because the methods and results of science have so profoundly affected all the philosophical thought of the age, that an educated man is under a very great disadvantage if he is unacquainted with them.
(Report by Schools Inquiry Commission, 1868: p219)
The committee subsequently made several recommendations; the first three on promoting scientific education in schools are listed below:
i. That in all schools natural science be one of the subjects to be taught, and that in every public school at least one natural science master be appointed for the purpose.
ii. That at least three hours a week be devoted to such scientific instruction.
iii. That natural science should be placed on an equal footing with mathematics and modern languages in effecting promotions and in winning honours and prizes.
(Report by Schools Inquiry Commission, 1868: p222)
The issue of increased cost for fee payers played heavily on the minds of the committee, and although the committee felt that for "a wealthy country like England" (page 219 of the report), a slight increase in cost should not be a barrier to science education, it was left to individual schools to decide how to incorporate science into their curricula.

Red brick universities
By the time of the Taunton Report there were four universities in England (Oxford, Cambridge, Durham and London), but from the 1880s, a new wave of universities / university colleges completely separate from the original four began to emerge; these universities were called red brick universities. The first of these universities was established in Manchester in 1880 and was called Victoria University. Over the subsequent 80 years, a further 11 universities outside London, Cambridge, Durham and Oxford were founded, significantly expanding the availability of university (science) education throughout England. All through the 1800s, science was becoming increasingly specialised into the different areas we know today.

1900s
The Education Act 1902 led to the higher grade schools (alluded to earlier) and fee-paying schools being absorbed into the legally defined “higher education” (meaning any education that was not elementary (as primary education was known at the time)). Despite science education in higher grade schools and the recommendations of the Taunton Report, as well as the British Association for the Advancement of Science's campaign for a science curriculum, science was still seen as a minor subject by the most prestigious public schools. The problem was that most of these public schools had close relationships with Oxford and Cambridge universities which offered the majority of their scholarships in classics, and so science was regarded in low importance by the prestigious schools. Consequently, science education varied significantly across English schools. Numerous education-related acts were passed throughout the twentieth century, but the most important in the history of science education in England was the Education Reform Act 1988 (see next subsection). Another Act of importance to the development of science education below university level in England was the Education Act 1944. The 1944 Act's contribution was indirect though—it raised the compulsory school age to 15, but made provisions for it to be raised to 16 at a future date—which happened in 1972 (which is still the case today). By raising the school leaving age to 16, this formed the basis for creating a nationally organised science curriculum and education in England. However, the 1944 Education Act did not stipulate that science be taught. For university level science education, two significant developments were the expansion of distance learning science courses and the introduction of the World Wide Web (via the Internet) into the delivery of science teaching, although this has also been adopted below university level.

Education Reform Act 1988
This was the most important development in the history of science education in England. It was this Act that established the National Curriculum and made science compulsory across both secondary and primary schools (alongside maths and English). The 1988 Act in effect implemented the recommendation of the Taunton Committee made more than a century earlier. The act also established the now familiar “key stages”.

2000s
The most significant developments to the science curriculum and education in this period to date have been the expansion of the compulsory science content in the National Curriculum and the associated changes to its assessment. Another significant event was the passing of the Education and Skills Act 2008, which raised the education leaving age in England to 18. It is unclear whether this extension of compulsory education will result in more science learners as science is not compulsory after the age of 16—the school leaving age, which the 2008 Act did not alter.

Compulsory science content and national assessments

Learning aims
Compulsory science content is provided by the National Curriculum and generally applies to children between the ages of 5 and 16. These eleven years of compulsory education are divided by the state into four key stages: KS1, KS2, KS3 and KS4. Regardless of key stage, the National Curriculum states two overarching aims of science education:
 develop scientific knowledge and conceptual understanding through the specific disciplines of biology, chemistry and physics
 develop understanding of the nature, processes and methods of science through different types of science enquiries that help them to answer scientific questions about the world around them
A third aim is common to KS1–3:
 are equipped with the scientific knowledge required to understand the uses and implications of science, today and for the future.
But for KS4, the third aim is far more detailed, and there is also a fourth aim:
 develop and learn to apply observational, practical, modelling, enquiry, problem-solving skills and mathematical skills, both in the laboratory, in the field and in other environments;
 develop their ability to evaluate claims based on science through critical analysis of the methodology, evidence and conclusions, both qualitatively and quantitatively.
The need for mathematical skills is stressed by the National Curriculum across all key stages, but more so at KS3 and KS4.

Pedagogical considerations
The National Curriculum for science is a spiral curriculum; it is also prescriptive. Because of its spiral nature, this makes its learning essentially constructivist. These points are illustrated in the subsections that follow. In addition, the Science National Curriculum emphasises the need for active learning right from the child's earliest exposure to the curriculum. Research on the value of active learning has been demonstrated and published. Experimentation by the child is underscored in the curriculum accompanied by careful discussion of what was observed. Despite these positive features, it has been argued that evaluating the effectiveness of the National Curriculum on learning is difficult to answer.

State of science education in primary education
There is evidence that primary school pupils, that is, KS1 and KS2, in the UK get very little science education. The reason for this appears to be a lack of science expertise in primary schools. This has three implications: First, primary school pupils in state schools (that is, publicly funded schools) generally do not start getting regular science classes till KS3 (the first stage of secondary education). This leads to the second implication, in that there is likely to be a wide variation in pre-secondary school science knowledge among pupils at the start of KS3. And the third implication, as lack of science education does not appear to be an issue for pupils in prep schools (remember prep schools are private or independent schools), it means that pupils that have done their primary education in state schools, wishing to transfer to independent schools at senior level, are likely to face a significant disadvantage when attempting the Science Common Entrance Examination (since the state primary school pupils would have done relatively little science unless supplemented by private tutorials).

KS1
Key stage 1 (KS1) covers the first two years of compulsory school education in the National Curriculum. As such, the years are referred to as years 1 and 2. Children are typically in the age range 5–7. If a full science curriculum is offered as prescribed by the National Curriculum, then the emphasis of science at this stage should be observation and describing or drawing things that the child can see, either around them or from a book or photograph or video; the feel of materials is also an important feature of KS1 science. Abstract concepts in science are not introduced at this stage (at least not on the basis of the National Curriculum). As a result, the science curriculum at KS1 should be more or less plants and animals, and materials, with the emphasis on what can easily be seen or described by feeling things.

KS2 (including SATs, 11+ CEs, and teacher assessments)
Key stage 2 (KS2) covers years 3, 4, 5 and 6 of compulsory school education in the National Curriculum. It is the longest stage of compulsory school education in England. Children are typically in the age range 7–11. The National Curriculum divides KS2 into lower KS2 (years 3 and 4) and upper KS2 (years 5 and 6). If a full science curriculum is offered as prescribed by the National Curriculum then year 3 should continue from KS1, but with more complex observations for the child to do on plants and animals, and materials—rocks, fossils and soils, are brought in. Setting up simple experiments and recording data should become increasingly important at this stage. Hazards and dangers of certain scientific experiments (such as feeling things after they have been heated) should be drilled into pupils; necessary precautions against such dangers/hazards are taught. New areas should be introduced: light (and the dangers of looking directly at sunlight with necessary precautions), forces and magnets. In year 4, classification of living and non-living things come to the fore; additional areas introduced include:
 Environmental change
 Digestive system and food chains
 States of matter
 Sound
 Electricity
In years 5 and 6 (upper KS2), the National Curriculum states that the emphasis should be on enabling pupils develop a deeper understanding of scientific ideas. The need to read, spell and pronounce scientific vocabulary correctly is emphasised by the National Curriculum. This emphasis probably reflects the fact that by the age of 9, 10 or 11, a child in England should be able to read and write properly. Year 5 should continue on from year 4; studying increasingly more complex aspects of what was introduced in year 4. Also the pupil should start learning to accept or refute ideas based on scientific evidence. Additional areas should include:
 Life cycles
 Reproduction in some plants and animals
 Growing old
 Properties and changes of materials
 Earth and space
Year 6 not only continues on from year 5, adding more complex aspects of what was learnt in year 5, but should also prepare the pupil for KS3 science; additional areas include:
 Circulatory system
 Drugs and lifestyle
 Evolution and inheritance

SATs and teacher assessments
Between the early 1990s and early 2010s, state school pupils had to take statutory SAT exams at the end of KS2 science although teacher assessments were also allowed. The KS2 SAT science exam consisted of two papers (forty-five minutes each). The scores from both papers were combined to give a final score. This score would then be converted into a numerical level, which would in turn be converted into an expectation level. The conversion scale for the levels at KS2 SAT science is shown in the table below.

Science KS2 SATs

Level 6 (exceptional) was also available, but only in mathematics and English (reading); a separate test for level 6 assessment had to be taken, which had to be marked externally. Science KS2 SATs were discontinued in 2013 and replaced by teacher assessments (which were already allowed during the time of SATs). In addition to teacher assessments, a SAT replacement assessment called key stage 2 science sampling test is now offered to five randomly selected pupils in a school every two years. The test comprises three papers: ‘b’ for biology, ‘c’ for chemistry, and ‘p’ for physics (each twenty-five minutes). The aim of the tests is to assess how well children are getting on with the curriculum. The first test of this kind was in the summer of 2016.

11+ CEs (Common Entrance Examination)
This exam is run by the Independent Schools Examinations Board and is taken by prep school pupils wishing to be admitted into senior schools, although not all senior schools admit 11-year-olds. Some state school pupils in KS2 use the exam to make the transition into an independent (senior) school. The syllabus for the 11+ CE science exam is based on the National Curriculum for KS2 science; one paper for science (one hour) is taken. In addition to the examinable syllabus for the 11+ CE, there is also prep-KS3 science material for the pupil to cover; this prep-KS3 science material is not examinable, but is required as preparation for KS3 science study in senior school if admitted.

The ‘traditional’ three sciences for KS3 and KS4
The National Curriculum for KS3–4 science differs from KS1–2 not just in its complexity, but unlike the latter, the science curriculum is divided into three explicit parts: biology, chemistry and physics. Typically in a state secondary school there can be anything from one to up to three (or even more) teachers delivering science to a single class (depending on the breadth of knowledge of the teacher and staff resources of the school); remember that for many, if not most, entrants to state secondary schools, KS3 will be the first stage at which they get regular science education. Broadly speaking, similar areas are covered at both stages (that is KS3 and KS4), but at a more advanced level in KS4. Below is a broad (and simplified) summary of the curriculum of each part at KS3/4 level.

Biology
Defined in the National Curriculum as:
... the science of living organisms (including animals, plants, fungi and microorganisms) and their interactions with each other and the environment.
The content for KS3/4 biology in the National Curriculum is broadly:
 Cell biology and organisation
 Organ systems of animals and plants (vary between KS3 and KS4)
 Biochemistry
 Health, disease and medicines
 Bioenergetics (respiration and photosynthesis)
 Ecosystem
 Genetics and inheritance
 Variation within and between species, and evolution

Chemistry
Defined in the National Curriculum as:
... the science of the composition, structure, properties and reactions of matter, understood in terms of atoms, atomic particles and the way they are arranged and link together.
The content for KS3/4 chemistry in the National Curriculum is broadly:
 Atoms, elements, mixtures, compounds and the particulate nature of matter
 The periodic table and periodicity
 Properties of matter
 Chemical reactions and changes
 Chemical analysis
 Chemical energetics
 Materials (both natural and synthetic)
 Earth and atmosphere

Physics
Defined in the National Curriculum as:
... the science of the fundamental concepts of field, force, radiation and particle structures, which are inter-linked to form unified models of the behaviour of the material universe.
The content for KS3/4 physics in the National Curriculum is broadly:
 Energy, work, power and thermodynamics
 Physical nature of matter
 Particle model of matter
 Atomic structure and radioactivity (both are mainly covered in KS4 physics)
 Electricity, magnetism and electromagnetism
 Mechanics (forces and motion)
 Waves (including sound and light) and electromagnetic waves (KS4)
 Space physics and astrophysics (not always covered at KS4, depends on GCSE exam board and whether 'combined' or 'triple' science)

KS3 (including SATs, 13+ CEs, and teacher assessments)
Key stage 3 (KS3) covers years 7, 8 and 9 of compulsory school education in the National Curriculum. Pupils are typically in the age range 11–14.

SATs and teacher assessments
Between the early 1990s and late 2000s (‘late noughties’) state school pupils had to take statutory SAT exams at the end of KS3 science (just like KS2), although teacher assessments were also allowed. The KS3 SAT science exam consisted of two papers (one hour each). The scores from both papers were combined to give a final score. This score would then be converted into a numerical level, which would in turn be converted into an expectation level. The conversion scale for the levels at KS3 SAT is shown below.

The conversion of the raw score from the two papers to a numerical level depended on the ‘tier’ taken by the student. For science KS3 SATs, two tiers were available: lower tier and higher tier. Levels 3–6 were available at the lower tier while levels 5–7 were available at the higher tier. The conversion scale for each tier's scores are shown below.

Science KS3 SATs: lower tier

Science KS3 SATs: higher tier

Level 8 (exceptional) was not available to science KS3 SATs (not even at the higher tier); it was available to mathematics, but only at the highest tier (levels 6–8) out of four tiers that were available to mathematics KS3 SATs. Science KS3 SATs were discontinued in 2010 and replaced by teacher assessments (just like science KS2 SATs). Despite the discontinuation of statutory science KS3 SATs, the past papers are still used by schools today.

13+ CEs (Common Entrance Examination)
Like the 11+ CEs, the 13+ CEs are taken by prep school pupils wishing to be admitted to independent senior schools; some senior schools only admit from the age of 13. The examination provides an opportunity for some KS3 state school pupils to make the transition into an independent school. The syllabus for the 13+ CE science exam(s) is based on the National Curriculum for KS3 science, although not all of the KS3 science content is examinable in the CE, but the parts left out are recommended for teaching in year 9. For the exam the candidate can take either the simpler one paper in science (one hour) comprising biology, chemistry and physics parts, or three higher (and harder) papers (forty minutes each)—one in biology, one in chemistry, and one in physics. In addition, individual senior schools may have exams for entry into other years; for example, 14+, 16+ (for post-16 or ‘KS5’ study); details of which they give on their websites.

KS4 (including GCSEs)
Key stage 4 (KS4) covers years 10 and 11 of compulsory school education, but it may start earlier for science (and mathematics) in some schools. Pupils are typically in the age range 14–16. At the end of KS4, students have to take statutory GCSE exams, which can be taken at either foundation tier or higher tier. Science GCSEs can be complicated in that they offer a vast array of ‘routes’ although this has simplified somewhat following recent changes to GCSEs. Today science GCSE can be taken either as a combined single subject (which is worth two GCSEs) or as the three separate subjects of physics, chemistry and biology, (each worth a single GCSE in its own right). When biology, chemistry and physics are taken as separate GCSE subjects the tiers can be mixed. So for instance, a student could take say, biology at higher tier, but chemistry at foundation tier. By contrast, tiers cannot be mixed in combined science (that is, all constituent parts must be taken at the same tier). Experiments (also called practicals) are compulsory in the GCSE science course, but in different ways across the boards offering GCSE science to English schools. For most boards the results of the practicals do not count towards the final grade in the reformed GCSE (as this is determined entirely by the results of the written examination), but the school/college must submit a signed practical science statement to the board under which the science is being studied BEFORE the students can take the examination. The statement must declare that all students have completed all the required practicals. The skills and knowledge that should have been acquired from the practicals are subsequently assessed in the GCSE exams, which for most boards are entirely written (as alluded to earlier). For one board (CCEA) however, in addition to the examination of practical skills in the written papers, the results of some of the actual practicals do count towards the final grade in the reformed GCSE. Currently, GCSE sciences in England are available from five boards: AQA, OCR, Edexcel. WJEC-Eduqas and CCEA. Although all five boards provide GCSE science to English schools, not all of these boards are based in England: AQA, OCR and Edexcel are based in England, but WJEC-Eduqas is based in Wales, while CCEA is based in Northern Ireland. Schools are free to choose any board for their science, and where the three sciences of chemistry, physics and biology are being taken independently at GCSE level, all three sciences need not be taken from the same board. Some boards offer multiple routes for their combined science courses in the reformed GCSE in England.

AQA combined science
Following recent changes, a student can go for one of two routes if taking AQA combined science: trilogy or synergy. In trilogy, science is delivered in the three traditional parts of biology, chemistry and physics. The trilogy specification document  outlines topics for each science part and practicals are specified. The trilogy GCSE exam itself is made up of six papers (each one hour and fifteen minutes): two for biology, two for chemistry, and two for physics. In synergy, science is delivered in two parts: life and environmental sciences AND physical sciences. Unlike trilogy, each of the two parts in the synergy specification document  is broken down into ‘areas’ that enable biology, chemistry and physics to sit together. The synergy GCSE exam itself is made up of four papers (each one hour and forty-five minutes): two for life and environmental sciences and two for physical sciences.

OCR combined science
Like AQA combined science, following recent changes, a student can go for one of two routes if taking OCR combined science; in this case either combined science A or combined science B. In combined science A, science is delivered in the three traditional parts of biology, chemistry and physics. Like AQA's trilogy, each science part is broken into topics in combined science A's specification document , but unlike AQA combined science, practicals are suggested rather than specified, although practicals are still compulsory (the same goes for combined science B). The GCSE combined science A exam is made up of six papers (each one hour and ten minutes): two each for biology, chemistry and physics respectively. In combined science B, the science curriculum is delivered in four parts: biology, chemistry, physics and combined science. Each part is broken into topics in the combined science B specification document . The exam itself is made up of four papers (each one hour and forty-five minutes): one each for biology, chemistry, physics and combined science respectively.

Combined science from Edexcel or WJEC–Eduqas
Following the changes to GCSEs, only one route is available to the student that takes Edexcel or Eduqas combined science. In Edexcel's combined science specification document  the curriculum is delivered in the three traditional disciplines of biology, chemistry and physics, but in Eduqas's , the science curriculum is divided into four parts: Concepts in Biology,  Concepts in Chemistry, Concepts in Physics and Applications in Science. The Eduqas combined science exam is made up of four papers (one hour and forty-five minutes each): one for each of the three 'Concepts in ...' and one for 'Applications in Science'. The Edexcel exam is made up of six papers (each one hour and ten minutes): two each for biology, chemistry and physics respectively.

New double award science from CCEA
The new combined science from CCEA since the GCSE reforms retains the same name as its predecessor. The specification document  presents the science curriculum in the traditional disciplines of biology, chemistry and physics. The exam is the most extensive of the GCSE science boards; made up of nine papers and three practical exams. For each of biology, chemistry and physics there are three papers and one practical exam: Paper 1 is one hour long, Paper 2 is one hour and fifteen minutes, Paper 3 is a practical skills paper and is thirty minutes long, and the practical exam is one hour long.

Changes to GCSE science and its grading system
As alluded to earlier, in the mid-2010s, the GCSE science courses of the GCSE exam boards underwent significant changes. This was in part due to changes in the National Curriculum, of which one of the areas affected the most was key stage 4 (KS4). The revised version of the National Curriculum covered more content; the one for KS4 science was published in December 2014 and a version specifically for GCSE combined science was published in June 2015, and implemented in September 2016. The increased content triggered a change in the GCSE grading system from A*–G to 9–1. Much more detail on the new grading system and how it differs from the previous can be read here. One consequence of the increased science content in the National Curriculum was that it helped simplify a bewildering array of GCSE science courses particularly from AQA, which are/were designed to accommodate students from the least able to the most able. AQA science courses such as core science, additional science, further additional science, science A, science B, additional applied science illustrate the variety. The new trilogy and synergy courses (which were developed from the recently expanded National Curriculum for science) have removed the need for the most able students taking multiple science courses unless the student decides to take chemistry, biology and physics individually. The content for GCSE physics as a stand-alone subject is more than the content for physics in GCSE combined science. For instance, in the National Curriculum for KS4 science, space physics is included, but not in the GCSE combined science version. AQA includes space physics and astrophysics in its GCSE specification, but only when GCSE physics is taken as an independent subject in its own right, and not when physics is taken as part of GCSE combined science.

Science education post-16 or ‘KS5’
For the ages of 16, 17 and 18 (and older for those that remain in education below university level), students in England do what is sometimes loosely called ‘key stage 5’ or KS5; it has no legal meaning (unlike the other key stages). And unlike KS1–4 in which the levels of complexity of topics learnt at each stage are prescribed within relatively narrow limits, at KS5, the levels of complexity of topics cover a wide range, although the highest level of complexity at KS5 is RQF level 3. Whether or not a student actually studies at this level of complexity in KS5 depends on their GCSE results—crucially on what subjects the student obtained passes at RQF level 2 standard (including mathematics and English) as well as the actual grades themselves. In other words, unlike KS1–4, where a specific student studies at one RQF level, at KS5, a specific student may be studying at several RQF levels depending on what the student obtained at GCSEs. Regardless of the RQF-level mix, KS5 students can complete post-16 study in one of the following:
 School with a sixth form
 Stand-alone sixth form college
 Further education college
 Apprenticeship
 Traineeship

This can be done either full-time or part-time. If done part-time, the student also has to be working or volunteering for at least 20 hours a week. The science curriculum and education at KS5 is highly varied, often disparate and tends to be specialised as students in their late teens interested in science begin to study subjects that will prepare them for science careers. In KS5 study at RQF level 3, students are introduced to concepts they would never have heard of during their time from KS1 to KS4, which they will either study in much greater depth at university level (if the student continues to study the science in question) or apply at vocational placements or apprenticeships. Practical science at KS5–RQF level 3 can be more extensive. Individual A levels in chemistry, biology and physics are perhaps the best known KS5–RQF level 3 science subjects (and they take two years to complete when done full-time), but A level students may well choose only one or two of these subjects, and mix with mathematics or non-science A level subjects depending on what university degree the student wishes to study post-KS5 (typically A level students go straight to university on successful completion of A levels). Although A levels are probably the highest profile KS5 studies, there are other qualifications students can take as alternatives. KS5 science subjects (including laboratory science) can also be taken in BTECs, Cambridge Pre-Us, IBs, AQAs (non-A levels), OCRs (non-A levels). NVQs, university specific foundation year programmes (generally offered to students that have taken A levels, but not the correct ones, can also be offered to those that have failed their A levels), access to HEs (generally not available to students under 21). Although all these alternative non-A level qualifications (which are all available at RQF level 3) can offer content similar in complexity to their A/AS level counterparts (which are also RQF level 3), the make-up of their content can vary significantly depending on the subject, and the board offering it. A comprehensive list of most subjects at most levels and the boards offering them is kept by the National Careers Service and individual subjects and their boards can be searched for on their website . A search tool for only Ofqual approved list of subjects and their boards can be found at Ofqual: The Register; the list can also be downloaded from the site, while a search tool for only QAA approved access to HE subjects can be found at Access to Higher Education. Both the National Careers Service and Ofqual lists include all A/AS levels, GCSEs (RQF levels 1–2) and most of the rest (RQF levels 1–8, and the RQF entry level (which is below RQF level 1)). With regards to universities in England accepting RQF level 3 science subjects for their science degrees, students with only non-A level science subjects may be accepted, or the student may require a mixture of some of these non-A level science subjects with one or two A/AS level science subjects. This all depends on the level 3 qualification in question, the university, and science degree the student wishes to study. Individual universities give details of their entry requirements for their various science (and obviously all) degrees on their websites. Some RQF level 3 students may use the KS5 science subjects they study for entry into higher/degree apprenticeships or university-level vocational training.

Adult returners to education

Beyond 18 years of age, students that have already either left or finished their formal education, but return at later times in their lives to study science (having decided they do not have the appropriate level of knowledge), can do so on their return at RQF level 3 or lower. The level the student returns at will depend on their pre-enrollment level of knowledge of science, although science is generally not available below RQF level 1 (that is, the RQF entry (sub-1) level) to adult returners to education (but maths and English are). Typically, further education colleges admit adult returners, although some universities may offer distance learning courses. Further education and distance learning courses are often the ways these mature students can access science courses long after they have left education. Just like students that have neither left nor previously finished their education, satisfactorily passing the summative assessment at RQF level 3 is the crucial gateway into university-level education (that is RQF level 4 and higher) in England. In addition to satisfactory passes in science subjects at RQF level 3, the learner also has to have passed mathematics and English at RQF level 2 standard (typically GCSEs or equivalent with minimum (or equivalent minimum) grades of 'C' or '4'); providers of university-level education give details on their websites.

Science education at university level
Like post-16 or KS5, this is also highly varied, disparate and specialised, but more so, as a student may choose to study 'one' science, which s/he will subsequently study in depth for three or more years; the summative assessment leads to a degree (of which for science in England today is typically RQF level 5, 6 or 7; if it is level 5, the qualification is called a foundation degree). Such education will enable students market themselves as (specialist) scientists to employers or postgraduate science degree programmes (although the choices available to the graduate are affected by the class of degree the graduate achieves—recruiters give details on their websites; foundation degree graduates will have to 'top-up' to a full degree for post-graduate study). Many concepts the student first encountered in A levels / RQF level 3 are dealt with in much greater detail. The biggest difference between A level / RQF level 3 science and university-level science occurs in physics, which at university-level becomes highly mathematical (and at times difficult to distinguish from mathematics). Practical science at university-level can be quite extensive and by the time of the dissertation project, the student may well be doing complex experiments lasting weeks or months unsupervised (although s/he will still have a supervisor on hand). Science degrees in England are offered by both universities and some further education colleges. University-level teachers (also referred to in England as lecturers) will teach one area of the science the student is studying, but two notable differences between university level science education in further education colleges and universities are that in universities, there is a close connection between teaching and research. In other words, it is common for a university teacher to be a researcher in the area s/he teaches—this applies not just to science, but to all areas; such connection between teaching and research does not occur in further education colleges in England. And the other difference is that further education colleges must have their degrees approved by universities. Although universities do not need approval for their science degrees and are free to set their own content, they generally get many of their science courses accredited by professional bodies. So for example, universities offering biology degrees commonly get these programmes accredited by the Royal Society of Biology; for chemistry degrees, it is the Royal Society of Chemistry; for physics degrees, it is the Institute of Physics; for geology degrees, it is the Geological Society, and so on. Accreditation of a science degree by a professional body is a precondition if the student studying the degree wishes to become a member of the body following graduation, and subsequently acquire chartered status. In addition, UK universities are obliged to ensure that their degrees meet the standards agreed to in the Bologna Process to which the UK is a co-signatory. The QAA certifies those British degrees that meet those standards. Not all university-level students studying science study for science degrees; many will study science as part of a vocational degree such as pharmacy, medicine, dentistry, nursing, veterinary medicine, allied health professions, and so on. And some will study science as part of a higher/degree apprenticeship.

Challenges for science education in England

Pre-university level
The challenges of establishing a national curriculum for science below university level in England over the last two centuries have been explored by Smith (2010) and others. In Smith's paper, she highlighted two potentially conflicting roles for science education below university-level: educating a public to be scientifically literate, and providing scientific training for aspiring science professionals. Smith further pointed out in her paper that even among the training of aspiring science professionals, three groups could be identified: those that sought science in pursuance of the truth and an abstract understanding of science; those that sought science for actual benefit to society—the applied scientists, and then the failures. The dilemma did not escape the committee led by J J Thomson (discoverer of the electron) in 1918, which is quite telling of the tension in trying to accommodate several very different groups of science learners:
In framing a course in Science for boys up to the age of 16 it should be recognised that for many this will be the main, for some the only, opportunity of obtaining a knowledge of Science, and that the course should therefore be self-contained, and designed so as to give special attention to those natural phenomena which are matters of everyday experience, in fine, that the Science taught in it should be kept as closely connected with human interests as possible.
(Report by Thomson Committee, 1918: p23)
Such tension has never really dissipated. In a report by the Royal Society from 2008, they state several challenges facing science education; the first two are reproduced here:

The first:
provide science and mathematics education appropriate for students of all levels of attainment in an environment where more students remain in education post-16;
and the second: 
give a solid core grounding in science and mathematics to those who will probably not continue studying these subjects post-16;
(Report by the Royal Society, 2008: p17)
A lack of good quality teachers has also been cited as a challenge. Difficulty recruiting science teachers, which is a current problem in England (and the UK as a whole) is certainly not new as the following extract from the report by the Thomson Committee in 1918 shows:
The first and indispensable condition for any real improvement in the teaching of Science in schools of all kinds is that effective steps should be taken to secure an adequate supply of properly qualified teachers. The supply is inadequate for existing needs ...
(Report by Thomson Committee, 1918: p31)
Some interesting figures were quoted in the 1918 report; for instance on page 31 of the report: out of 72 schools that had 200–400 girls of all ages, only 39 had the services of two science teachers (mistresses). The report went on state that these figures had contributed to long hours and inadequate salaries. This sounds strikingly similar to the situation facing science (and indeed all) school teachers in England today; a hundred years later. Another challenge was that there was not an appreciation by the political elite on the value of a science education to the wider public; despite the fact that England was producing some of the greatest scientists in the world. Yet another challenge was that public schools were slow to respond to the needs of developing a science curriculum. For example, William Sharp was the first science teacher for Rugby School, a prestigious public school in England, which only happened for the first time in 1847; nearly 300 years after the college was established and more than 100 years after England had lost one of the world's greatest scientists—Isaac Newton. Despite these challenges, a science curriculum and education developed through the twentieth century and eventually became a compulsory part of the new National Curriculum in 1988 (phased in from 1989 to 1992). Even at the time of the deliberations in the mid-1980s prior to the creation of the National Curriculum, there was disagreement over how much time science should occupy in the curriculum. There was pressure for science to be made to occupy 20% of curriculum time for 14–16-year-olds, but not everyone agreed with this; certainly not the then Secretary of State for Education and Science Kenneth Baker. The then Department for Education and Science settled for 12.5% of curriculum time, but schools were free to increase this. The result was the emergence of single science (which occupied 10% of curriculum time and was the minimum requirement—also called core science), double science (which occupied 20% of curriculum time, and was so called because it involved studying core science and additional science), and there was the option of doing the sciences of physics, chemistry and biology separately (also known as 'triple' science). Following the changes to the National Curriculum in the 2010s, single science has effectively been removed, and the two components of double science have been combined to form 'combined science', which is now the minimum requirement. One challenge that ties in with England's shortage of science teachers is the number of science undergraduates in higher education, which provides the pool for future trainee science teachers, but undergraduate numbers affect the three sciences differently: the number of students that study physical sciences in higher education (93050 in the year 2012/13) are less than half the students that study biological sciences (201520 in the year 2012/13). This has had a direct impact on government policy in England; for example, the UK government offers bursaries of £30000 to graduates with first class honours degrees wishing to train as physics teachers in secondary schools in England; for chemistry, the top bursary is £25000, and for biology it is £15000. For students with lower honours degrees in these subjects, correspondingly lower bursaries are offered, but they are still considerable for physics graduates (compared to bursaries offered to trainee teachers of other subjects). For instance, a physics graduate with a lower second class honours degree can still attract a bursary of £25000. But the government has also implemented a policy to increase the number of science graduates from UK universities: normally a student in England wishing to study for a first degree including an honours degree can get a UK-government-backed student loan as long as s/he does not already possess an honours degree. Exceptions are permitted, but prior to September 2017 (and in the case of postgraduate master's degrees, September 2016), these UK-government-backed loans for those in England that already had honours degrees were only available for them if the courses they were going to study led to professional qualifications such as medicine, dentistry, social care, architecture or teaching. However the range of subjects for which a student in England already in possession of an honours degree could get a second UK-government-backed student loan to study a second honours degree was expanded to include science subjects (as well as technology, engineering and mathematics), which took effect from 1 September 2017. Like before, the student has to meet both England and UK residency requirements . The inclusion of science, technology, engineering and mathematics (collectively called "STEM" subjects) to the list appears to have been triggered not just by teacher shortages in those subjects, but also by a general skills shortage (in those subjects) UK-wide. It remains to be seen whether the direct interventions by the UK government help alleviate the general skills shortages in STEM subjects, as well as the challenges of delivering a science curriculum and education in the long-term.

University level
As for science at university level in England, the specialised (and individualised) nature of study at this tertiary level means that a discussion on developing a national curriculum for university science education has never really taken hold. Instead, the challenges of science education at this level in England (and indeed across the world) have revolved, and still revolve, around the acts of establishing and maintaining one in the first place rather than harmonising content across all university courses. The prevailing politics or government and social norms could be issues for university science education; for example, the priorities of the Early Middle Ages (also known as the Dark Ages) following the collapse of the Western Roman Empire could have been challenges to the development of university science (in England), as could have been the attitudes and beliefs of the same period. In England, although university science education started hundreds of years after pre-university science education, the former eventually prospered in comparison to the latter. Despite these, the threat of closure of a university science department cannot be dismissed; for instance, the Physics Department at Birkbeck, University of London closed in 1997. Another closure was the Chemistry Department at Exeter University in 2005; something the Royal Society of Chemistry was critical of. The chemistry department's closure generated intense news coverage as well as anxiety in other departments and courses in the university, such as geography, not to mention the abuses the then university's vice-chancellor received. Commenting on the department's closure, Hodges (2006) alluded to one brutal reality of a university science department's purpose; unlike a school science department, the job of a university science department is not just to teach science to its students (as important as that is), but to actively bring in money, via research grants and otherwise (and lots of it). This influences whether a university keeps a science department (which is expensive to run) open or not. Put another way, a school or other pre-university level science department (even one offering science degrees) can survive on a large enough number of students doing its subject and the pass rate of those students, but not a university science department, which also needs to attract a lot of research money. This disparity in the way a university and a pre-university institution decides whether or not to run a science department might explain why pre-university institutions such as general further education colleges offer biology degrees (or foundation degrees), but rarely (if any) chemistry or physics degrees (since fewer students study these—see the previous subsection on 'Pre-university level'), despite producing no discernible research (details of universities and further education colleges in England and the rest of the UK offering science degrees can be found at the UCAS website). But attracting research money to a university science department is a whole quagmire in itself. More recently, several challenges to university science education that link into the issue of university science department survival have been identified by Grove (2015); the summaries of those challenges have been reproduced below:
 Operating in a global market
 Rising student expectations (as a result of the increased loans students in England have to take to pay their increased tuition fees)
 Increasing costs and shifting funding (as the UK government provides less grants and students take on additional loans (on top of the increased tuition fee loans) to compensate)
 A demand and need for new technologies
 Linking estates, strategy and the student
 Attracting and retaining the best talent
 Making research sustainable

These challenges apply not just to the university provision of science education, but to all areas of university education.

See also
Science Learning Centres

References 

Science education
Science education in the United Kingdom